The 1998–99 CBA season was the fourth season of the Chinese Basketball Association.

The season ran from December 27, 1998, to April 25, 1999.

The Air Force team withdrew from the league before the season got underway, so three clubs were promoted from the Second Division. The Sichuan Pandas, originally relegated at the end of the previous campaign, earned a reprieve. They were joined by the Jilin Northeast Tigers and Beijing Olympians.

Regular Season Standings
These are the final standings for the 1998-99 CBA regular season.

Playoffs 
The top 8 teams in the regular season advanced to the playoffs.

For the first time, the semifinals used best-of-five series to determine the advancing team.

In the Finals, the Bayi Rockets defeated the Liaoning Hunters (3-0), claiming their fourth straight CBA championship.

Teams in bold advanced to the next round. The numbers to the left of each team indicate the team's seeding in regular season, and the numbers to the right indicate the number of games the team won in that round. Home court advantage belongs to the team with the better regular season record; teams enjoying the home advantage are shown in italics.

Relegations
The bottom 4 teams played the relegation phase by round-robin.

The Ji'nan Army and Sichuan Pandas were relegated to the Second Division.

CBA Awards
These are the award winners for the 1998-99 CBA regular season.
 CBA Most Valuable Player: Sun Jun (Jilin Northeast Tigers)

See also
Chinese Basketball Association

References

 
Chinese Basketball Association seasons
League
CBA